The Municipality of Trzin ( or) is a municipality in the traditional region of Upper Carniola in central Slovenia. The seat of the municipality is the town of Trzin, which is also the only settlement in the municipality. Trzin became a municipality in 1998.

References

External links

Municipality of Trzin on Geopedia
Trzin municipal site

Trzin
1998 establishments in Slovenia